Marcus Antonius Julianus was the 8th procurator of Judea from 66 to 70, during the time of the First Jewish–Roman War.

Replacement
Julianus had taken over the role from Gessius Florus, who had done a poor job in avoiding conflict. The Procurator had used the palaces of Herod the Great at Caesarea for himself and as barracks for the Roman troops.  He had also taken gold from the temples of the Jews in the name of the emperor.

It may be that Marcus Antonius Julianus was a relative of Marcus Antonius Felix, governor from 52 to 58 which would have helped him to have a better understanding of affairs. However Julianus failed in stopping the Jewish revolt from becoming a war.

Julianus was apparently the last person to hold the title of Procurator of Judea, although when and how he left his post in unclear. Following the First Jewish-Roman War, Sextus Vettulenus Cerialis was appointed Legate of Judea.

Records
The only person to have kept records of the time was Flavius Josephus, who states that the real power at the time was with the General Vespasian, and then from 70 AD, his son Titus.

According to the writer Minucius Felix (in Octavius 33.4) he wrote a history relevant to the Jews of that time, but that is now lost.

See also
 Prefects, Procurators, and Legates of Roman Judaea

References

Roman governors of Judaea
1st-century Romans
1st-century historians
1st-century Roman governors of Judaea
Julianus, Marcus